This is a list of companies based in Idaho. Idaho is a state in the northwestern region of the United States. It is the 14th largest, the 39th most populous, and the 7th least densely populated of the 50 United States. The United States Census Bureau estimates that the population of Idaho was 1,654,930 as of July 1, 2015, up from 1,595,728 on July 1, 2012, a 1.8% increase since 2010. The state's largest city and capital is Boise. Today, the largest industry in Idaho is the science and technology sector. It accounts for over 25% of the state's total revenue and over 70% of the state's exports. Idaho's industrial economy is growing, with high-tech products leading the way. Idaho is an important agricultural state, producing nearly one-third of the potatoes grown in the United States.

Companies based in Idaho

A

 Albertsons
 Amalgamated Sugar Company

B

 Boise Cascade
 Buck Knives

C
 CCI 
 Chelton Flight Systems 
 Chesbro Music Company
 Chris Reeve Knives
 CityPASS 
 Clearwater Analytics
 ClickBank
 The Concierge Questionnaire 
 CSHQA

D
 D. L. Evans Bank 
 Dave Smith Motors

E

 Earth Point 
 Empire Airlines

F
 FIDO Friendly

G
 Grand Teton Vodka

H

 Hecla Mining

I
 Idacorp 
 Idaho Candy Company 
 Idaho Central Credit Union 
 Idaho Power
 Idaho Statesman

K 
 Klim

L
 Lamb Weston Holdings

M
 Micron Technology 
 Melaleuca

N
 Native American Services Corp.

O
 The Owyhee Avalanche

P

 Pacific Press Publishing Association
 Pita Pit (American Headquarters)
 Preco

Q
 Quest Aircraft

R
 Reel Theatres 
 Ridley's Family Markets
 Roady's Truck Stops 
 Rocky Mountain Construction

S

 Salmon Air 
 Scottevest 
 Simplot 
 Sunshine Minting

T
 TriGeo Network Security 
 TSheets

W
 WinCo Foods

Y
 Yellowstone Bear World

Companies formerly based in Idaho

A
 All That Is Heavy

B
 Building Materials Holding Corporation

C
 Coeur Mining 
 Coldwater Creek

K
 King's Variety Store

M
 Morrison-Knudsen 
 Mountain West Airlines-Idaho

P
 Press-A-Print
 ProClarity

S
 Super Saver Foods

V

 Varney Air Lines

W
 Washington Group International 
 Wayland & Fennell

See also
 :Category:Organizations based in Idaho
 List of breweries in Idaho

References

Companies
Idaho